The Reichsluftschutzbund (RLB; "Reich Air Protection League") was an organization in Nazi Germany in charge of air raid precautions in residential areas and among smaller businesses.

Purpose 
The RLB was organized by Hermann Göring in 1933 as a voluntary association. Existing volunteer air raid precaution associations were forced to merge with RLB. In 1939 the RLB became a Körperschaft des öffentlichen Rechts (quasi-autonomous non-governmental organization), while in 1944 it became an affiliated organization of the Nazi Party. RLB was dissolved by the Allied Powers after the end of World War II. Its successor in the Federal Republic of Germany was the Bundesverband für den Selbstschutz.

The RLB was in charge of educating and training ordinary German men and women in civil defence procedures necessary for the basic level of local self-help of the civil population against air raids. The local level was formed around air raid wardens and operated in small first intervention squads. The training include fire fighting, protection against chemical weapons, communication procedures and preparation of houses and apartments against air raids.

Organization

In 1939 the RLB had about 15 million members, 820,000 volunteer functionaries (of which 280,000 women) and 75,000 local units. The membership was trained at 3,800 civil defence schools with 28,000 instructors. 
 RLB was led by a Präsidium, whose president, and vice president and chief of staff, were active duty general officers of the Luftwaffe. The presidium was in itself a department immediately subordinated to the Ministry of Aviation.
 Coterminous with each Luftgaukommando (air district command) was a RLB-Gruppe (RLB-group) under a leader aided by 46 full-time staff members.
 For each Regierungsbezirk, there was a RLB-Bezirksgruppe (regional group).
 The basic organization was the RLB-Revier, one for each police precinct in the cities, or the RLB-Gemeinde-Gruppe, one for each urban or rural municipality for the rest of the country. In the case of a city with several precincts, the citywide organization was called an RLB-Ortsgruppe (local group). Several municipal groups formed an RLB-Ortskreisgruppe, one for each Landkreis. Each Ortsgruppe and Ortskreisgruppe had a leader and a staff of nine members, of which five where full-time salaried employees.
 The basic organizations had a varied number of Untergruppen (sub-groups) divided into Blöcke (blocks) under Blockwarte (block wardens) which controlled and liaised with a number of Luftschutzgemeinschaften (air raid protection communities) under Luftschutzwarte (air raid wardens). Each community consisted of an apartment building or several smaller buildings, although a large apartment complex could have several communities. In addition to the warden, the community should have an assistant warden, house fire fighters, helpers and messengers as a first intervention squad. Duty in these squads were compulsory (Notdienstpflicht) for the civilian population.

See also
 Ranks and insignia of the Reichsluftschutzbund

References
 Erich Hampe (1963), Der Zivile Luftschutz im Zweiten Weltkrieg, Frankfurt am Main: Bernard & Graefe, pp. 430–451.

Society of Nazi Germany
Organizations established in 1933
Civil defense